Hockey Club de Caen is a French ice hockey team based in Caen, Normandy playing in the Division 1. The team is also known as "Drakkars de Caen" (Caen Longships). The team was formerly called the Léopards de Caen.

The team was founded in 1968 and plays home games at the Patinoire de Caen la mer.

Prize list

Major Hockey 

 Continental Cup:
The best route: 1st tour in 2000–01.

 Ligue Magnus:
 Vice champion: 2000.
 Division 1: (4)
 Champion: 1979, 1989, 1998, 2010.
 Vice champion: 2009.
 Division 2: (1)
 Champion: 1994.
 Vice-champion: 1993, 2003.
 Division 3:
 Vice champion: 2002.
 Coupe de France: (1)
 Winner: 2000.
 Coupe de la Ligue:
The best route: Quarter-finals in 2008.

Minor Hockey 
 Championnat de France Cadet excellence:
 Champion: 2003.

Notable players
Luc Tardif

References

External links
 Official website 

Ice hockey teams in France
Sport in Caen
Ice hockey clubs established in 1968
1968 establishments in France